Franz Gehring (December 7, 1838 – January 4, 1884) was a German writer on music.

Gehring was a lecturer on mathematics at first in Bonn, since 1871 at Vienna University, but became known for his music writing, particularly his biographies. Among the most notable are his biography of Mozart published in Francis Hueffer's The Great Musicians series of books, and several articles contributed to the Grove Dictionary of Music and Musicians.

References

1838 births
1884 deaths
German biographers
Male biographers
German male non-fiction writers